Frank del Olmo (May 18, 1948 — February 19, 2004) was an editor, columnist and reporter for the Los Angeles Times, where he started as an intern in 1970. He graduated magna cum laude from California State University, Northridge with a degree in journalism in the same year and was recognized as both the outstanding journalism graduate and the outstanding overall graduate. He continued to work at the Los Angeles Times until he died of a heart attack in his office 34 years later. During his career, he was awarded with an Emmy Award, Pulitzer Prize for Public Service, and the Nieman Fellowship at Harvard University.

Early life and education
Del Olmo's father left the household soon after his birth, causing him to be raised by his mother, siblings and other family members. Del Olmo tried to enlist in the U.S. Air Force after graduation at the height of the Vietnam War but was rejected from becoming a fighter pilot because he did not satisfy the eyesight requirements. Instead, he received a full scholarship to study journalism at UCLA, but he was forced to continue his studies elsewhere when the journalism department closed two years later. Del Olmo transferred to California State University, Northridge and finished his journalism degree magna cum laude there in 1970. He was also recognized as both the outstanding journalism graduate and the outstanding overall graduate and started an internship during that summer at the Los Angeles Times, where he was mentored by Ruben Salazar.

Originally, del Olmo had the intention to attend Columbia University for a master's program in journalism on a full scholarship. This plan was quickly abandoned when the Chicano Moratorium started a march through East Los Angeles on August 29, 1970. His mentor, Ruben Salazar, was killed. Del Olmo canceled his scholarship to Columbia to continue Ruben's work at the Los Angeles Times.

Work
In 1972, del Olmo was the co-founder of the California Chicano News Media Association. He won an Emmy Award a few years later for "The Unwanted", a documentary on illegal immigration written by del Olmo. Throughout his work at the Los Angeles Times (and especially when he became a columnist in 1980), he wrote about and advocated on topics such as illegal immigration, issues affecting the Latino community, city policies, pop culture, and even baseball. Frank chaired a 1982 meeting of Latino journalists which led to the creation of the National Association of Hispanic Journalists in 1984.

Del Olmo and his team were awarded with the 1984 Pulitzer Prize for Public Service for their work on the 27-story Latinos. He became a Nieman Fellow at Harvard University in journalism from 1987–1988.

Del Olmo had a son in 1992, named Frank, who was diagnosed with autism in 1994. This led to del Olmo writing columns on autism in 1995, a topic he eventually wrote 10 columns about.

Del Olmo was promoted to associate editor in 1998, at which point he had already been the first Latino to be listed among the Times' top editors since 1989. Another major milestone before his death was his induction into the National Association of Hispanic Journalists Hall of Fame in 2002.

Throughout his career, del Olmo held positions as "an intern, a staff writer specializing in Latino issues and Latin American affairs, an editorial writer, deputy editor of the editorial page, a Times Mirror Company director and an assistant to the editor of The Times[, and associate editor]" (Los Angeles Times).

Death
On February 19, 2004, del Olmo collapsed in his office at the Los Angeles Times and was pronounced dead of a heart attack at Good Samaritan Hospital.

Legacy

In 2006, the Frank del Olmo Elementary School in Los Angeles (near Koreatown) was named in his honor. The dedication ceremony was attended by his wife, son, and daughter, as well as then Mayor Antonio Villaraigosa.

Frank del Olmo's archives reside in the University Library at California State University, Northridge.

References 

1948 births
2004 deaths
Los Angeles Times people
Editors of California newspapers
American columnists
California State University, Northridge alumni
Hispanic and Latino American journalists
Pulitzer Prize for Public Service winners
Nieman Fellows